A number of different numbering and classification schemes have been used for carriages and wagons on Britain's railways, and this page explains the principal systems. Carriages and wagons (either not self-propelled, or part of a multiple unit which has power units distributed throughout a semi-permanent formation of carriages) have frequently had similar arrangements for classification and numbering, so are considered together. There are also links to other pages that deal in greater depth with the particulars of individual types.

Note on classification
Carriage and wagon classification has never been quite the same as locomotive and multiple unit classification. For most railways, specific types were identified by their Diagram Number. This could simply be arranged by consecutive number, or there could be some greater organisation of numbers so that similar types were grouped together.

However, carriages and wagons have rarely been referred to in general terms by their Diagram Number. Instead there have been a variety of other codes and designations, referring to generic designs rather than specific types. For instance, there were the BR (adapted from the LNER system) and LMS carriage codes, which indicated interior layout or usage. The Great Western Railway (GWR) identified some of their non-passenger carriages and wagons through a series of animal designations, including sea life for departmental (non-revenue earning) stock, followed by a letter for detail differences, e.g. Beetle A.

The majority of the sections below deal solely with carriage and wagon numbering series, though where a particular classification system was used this is also described.

Pre-nationalisation arrangements
Before nationalisation in 1948, each railway company had its own numbering arrangements.

 The Great Western Railway and London, Midland and Scottish Railway (from 1933) adopted a system which allocated number ranges within a series for different types.
 The Southern Railway followed a similar approach, but used two series; for passenger carriages and for non-passenger carriages.
 The London and North Eastern Railway numbered its carriages with the first digit indicating the area it was allocated to.
 The Great Western Railway Diagram Numbers included a letter to indicate the general layout or usage, followed by a serial number issued consecutively.

British Railways
British Railways inherited the stock of the 'Big Four' and a substantial number of 'Private Owner' wagons. It also inherited the stock of the Pullman Car Company when it was nationalised in the late 1950s.

Numbering system

Arrangements at Nationalisation
The numbers of carriages and wagons inherited from the 'Big Four' companies were left unchanged, but with a prefix letter to show where they had originated from, as follows:

A "D" prefix in front of the regional prefix indicated departmental (non-revenue earning) stock. Departmental stock (including locomotives) inherited from the Southern Railway carried numbers with an "S" suffix (indicating Service stock, an alternative term for departmental) which was deleted and replaced with the "DS" prefix.

Former 'Private Owner' wagons, owned by industrial concerns rather than the railway companies, had a prefix letter "P" but were renumbered into a new series commencing at 3000.

Some carriages and wagons built by British Railways to the designs of the 'Big Four' companies were numbered in their series and carried the appropriate letter prefix. BR then introduced its own number series, for wagons beginning with B. Initially most designs were based on, or similar to, those of the pre-Nationalisation companies.

Arrangements from 1951
In 1951, the first production carriages built to British Railways' designs appeared, known as the Mark I. Numbers had a prefix letter (or letters) to indicate the region to which the carriage was allocated, and responsible for the maintenance. The inherited carriages then had a suffix letter indicating the company of origin.

New carriages had no suffix: when Pullman Company carriages were added, their numbers carried both prefix and a suffix (indicating regional allocation), as did the 2 tier car carriers built for the East Coast services.

The regional allocation letters used were:

Wagons retained the existing prefixes indicating their origin, and new stock built to British Railways designs was given a "B" prefix.

British Railways adopted the following numbering system for carriages and wagons built to its own designs (a small number of types built to pre-Nationalisation designs were later allocated numbers in this series, but only following rebuilding to new types). Note that in this table, reference is made to first, second and third class; from June 1956, second class was abolished and third class was renamed second class (and again to standard class in 1987). The few BR-design second class carriages (intended for use in Boat Trains since ships had three classes of accommodation) were designated as first class or unclassified.

Numbers 100000 to 999999 were used for non-passenger rated stock (including wagons, vans and departmental (non-revenue earning) carriages), while internal user vehicles (stock used for internal purposes (e.g. stores) at specific locations and unlikely to move) took numbers in the 0xxxxx series. For more details see below.

The same series was used for Mark 2 coaches built in the 1960s, but when Mark 3 carriage was introduced in the early 1970s new number ranges were carved out of the old series. These new ranges were perpetuated for Mark 4 carriages in the 1980s, and were as follows:

Diesel multiple unit builds in the 1980s utilised the 52xxx, 55xxx, 57xxx and 58xxx series for carriages, all of which were motored. The 55xxx and 58xxx contained a mix of driving and non-driving motors, but the 52xxx and 57xxx cars were all driving motors. Some series have been used for conversions of carriages, e.g. 63xx has been used for a variety of miscellaneous carriages, including generator vans and observation saloons.

A major change came in May 1983 when prefix and suffix letters was abandoned, and any carriage that had the same number as another carriage or a locomotive was renumbered. The programme worked as follows:

Further renumberings have taken place as new locomotives were introduced. Most have involved only a handful of carriages, but a major one saw carriages in the 920xx series renumbered 929xx when Class 92 locomotives were introduced.

This series has been perpetuated, though the series have been adapted for new generation multiple unit stock. For instance, the latest diesel multiple units have reused the 50xxx and 79xxx series for driving motors and the 56xxx series for non-driving motors. In the electric multiple unit series, Class 390 Pendolinos have reused the 68xxx and 69xxx series.

When BR began to build air braked wagons they had B prefixes, but this was dropped and six-figure numbers were used without prefix. Prefixes were added, however, if and when carriages and wagons transferred to the departmental/engineers' fleets.

Privately owned wagons and carriages were allocated numbers with an integral prefix to differentiate them from the BR number series, with carriages taking numbers in the 954xx and 99xxx series. From 1986, those carriages in the 99xxx series which otherwise duplicated BR bullion and exhibition van numbers were renumbered, and from then on the prefix was not essential for identification. Post-privatisation, with all carriages being privately owned, this list was discontinued and many carriages reverted to carrying their original BR number.

Departmental and Internal User Stock
Most departmental and internal user vehicles are converted from revenue-earning stock; only a small number are built for non-revenue earning use. Initially stock inherited from the 'Big Four' companies was given regional prefixes (e.g. DE, DM, DS and DW) indicating their origin, and adapting existing number series.

From about 1951, British Railways started to use new numbering series for additions to departmental and internal user stock on a regional basis, as follows:

No prefix letters were used for internal user stock. Departmental wagons (and some passenger-rated non-passenger carrying coaching stock) often kept their original revenue earning stock number, but with the addition of the "D" prefix. On some occasions, passenger coaches that had been converted for use as wagons then entered departmental stock retaining their wagon number (most notably brake vans in the 963xxx series that were formerly passenger brake vehicles).

By the end of the 1960s, British Rail-built carriages were entering departmental stock and being allocated one of the regional prefixes according to their location, but from 1967 the "DB" prefix was introduced for all additions to departmental stock regardless of origin. This prefix was prefixed with a letter to indicate the use of the vehicle, as follows:

The principal numbering series for carriages with the "DB" prefix have been 975xxx, then 977xxx. The latest series to be used is 971xxx. Carriages built new into departmental stock have usually been numbered in the 999xxx (and sometimes 998xxx) series (though this series also contains some conversions too).

Also in the early days of the "DB" prefix, some departmental locomotives were numbered in the 966xxx and 968xxx series, though in recent years those locomotives that remain self-propelled have been allocated locomotive Class 97.

TOPS CARKND classification system
When the Total Operations Processing System was introduced by British Railways, classifications were applied to all carriages and wagons and recorded in a field called CARKND, which is now also used to refer to the classification system as a whole. The classification typically comprises three letters, the first of which indicates the broad type, as follows:

The second letter gave more detailed information, different for each series. The tables below list the variations for carriages:

Apart from hauled passenger carriages ('A' series), the final letter indicated the braking arrangements. Nowadays almost all stock is air-braked, but when TOPS was introduced there was much greater variety, which made marshalling trains more complicated and this information essential. The letters were:

For hauled passenger carriages ('A' series), the suffix denoting the braking arrangements was replaced by two characters as follows:

An additional digit denoted the class of passenger accommodation:

The final suffix indicated the build of the coach:

This resulted in a 4 character alphanumeric TOPS classification, such as AB21 representing a Mark 1 Brake Corridor Second (BSK).

See also
 Coaches of the London, Midland and Scottish Railway

References

Further reading

External links
 www.departmentals.com

British Rail numbering and classification systems
Big four British railway companies